Lacy Lake is a small lake located east of Port Alberni, British Columbia.  It lies south east  of Esary Lake. It is the main water supply for the Cherry Creek Improvement District.

Access
Lacy Lake can be accessed by following Horne Lake Road, past Horne Lake Caves and across a bridge that is on the left. After approximately one kilometre there is a logging access gate that should be open. After the gate it is another six kilometres to the gate for Lacy Lake. Continue on the main logging road - there is a fork that you need to stay to the left then another fork you need to stay to the right. This is a lovely lake if you just want to go to explore. No fishing or swimming is permitted in Lacy Lake .

References

Alberni Valley
Lakes of Vancouver Island
Lakes of British Columbia
Alberni Land District